The Bastrop County Complex fire was a conflagration that engulfed parts of Bastrop County, Texas, in September and October 2011. The wildfire was the costliest and most destructive wildfire in Texas history and among the costliest in U.S. history, destroying 1,696 structures and causing an estimated $350 million in insured property damage. An exceptional drought, accompanied by record-high temperatures, affected Texas for much of 2011. Vegetation consequently became severely parched throughout the state, and over the year an unprecedented amount of land in the state was burned by numerous wildfires. In early September 2011, the presence of Tropical Storm Lee to the east produced strong northerly winds over the state, exacerbating the preexisting dry weather to produce critical fire conditions. On the afternoon of September 4, 2011, three separate fires ignited in the wildland–urban interface east of Bastrop, Texas, after strong winds caused by the nearby tropical storm snapped trees onto power lines. Within 48 hours, fires merged into one blaze that quickly consumed parts of Bastrop State Park and parts of the Lost Pines Forest, as well as homes in nearby subdivisions. Most of the conflagration's spread and destruction occurred within a week of ignition, as the forward advance of the wildfire mostly stopped after September 7. The wildfire was largely contained in September, though the firebreak was briefly breached in early October. On October 10, the Bastrop County Complex was declared controlled and the fire was declared extinguished on October 29 after 55 days of burning within the fire perimeter.

Two people were killed by the wildfire and another twelve people were injured. The fire perimeter encircled an area spanning 32,400 acres (13,100 hectares). Homes were destroyed in ten subdivisions, of which Circle-D County Acres and Tahitian Village sustained the most significant property damage. The wildfire destroyed more homes than any single fire in Texas history by nearly a factor of ten. Around 96 percent of Bastrop State Park was scorched by the wildfire. Roughly 1.5 million trees across 16,200 acres (6,600 hectares) of forest  were either killed directly by the fire or fatally damaged. Despite the severe habitat loss, populations of local herpetofauna were not significantly affected by the fire, though extensive soil erosion was enabled by the loss of groundcover. The cost of repairing the damage inflicted by the fire was equivalent to five years of property tax revenue for the Bastrop County government.

Setting and environmental conditions 

The Bastrop County complex occurred within the Lost Pines Forest of Texas, a region characterized by a lolloby pine (Pinus taeda) canopy, a yaupon (Ilex vomitoria) understory, sandy soils, and a mixed topography of flat terrain and rolling hills. Oak trees, Ashe juniper (Juniperus ashei), shrubs, and grasses also comprise the vegetation of the region. The Lost Pines cover a  area and are a disjunct population separated from the Piney Woods by 100 mi (160 km) of agricultural land. Historical wildfire behavior in Texas has been strongly influenced by human activities and changes in land use, affecting the makeup and composition of the vegetation impacted by the fire. The prevalence of cattle in Bastrop County between the 1860s and mid-1880s may have led to a reduction in fires in and around what is now Bastrop State Park via the grazing of potential fuels. However, the harsh winter of 1886–1887 brought an end to open-range grazing by 1890; this may have allowed for an increase in wildfires in subsequent decades. Greater utilization of wildfire suppression after the mid-1940s led to an increase in tree density in the region, further augmented by the concurrent planting of additional lolloby pine trees. The reduction in wildfires after the 1940sleading to the lowest fire activity since at least 1720led to a build-up in vegetation density (and thus potential fuels for a wildfire) to unprecedented levels. In the years leading up to the Bastrop County Complex, the only large wildfire in the area was the Wilderness Ridge Fire in 2009, which burned 1,491 acres (603 hectares). The vegetation in and around Bastrop State Park indicates that no fire before 2011, dating back to at least 1650, matched the severity of the Bastrop County Complex.

Texas endured one of its worst droughts in recorded history throughout much of 2011. Based on paleoclimate reconstructions, the summer of 2011 may have been the fourth driest summer in Texas since 996. Temperatures during the summer of 2011 also rose to record highs, with statewide average temperatures from June through August 2011 eclipsing the previous record high by 2 °F; each of the three months was their respective warmest month on record. Additionally, the mean statewide temperature in those three months were the hottest summer months recorded in any U.S. state on record, topping the record heat set in Oklahoma during the Dust Bowl. 

Dry conditions perpetuated by the drought led to widespread die-offs of trees across central and eastern Texas by the early fall of 2011, and most forests throughout the state were exceptionally dry; 251 of the 254 counties in Texas had bans on outdoor burning in effect in September 2011. The moisture content of all vegetation types within Bastrop County diminished to record lows during the course of the drought, making them increasingly susceptible to combustion. According to the U.S. Drought Monitor, the entirety of Bastrop County had remained in exceptional droughtthe most severe drought conditionssince the week of May 10, 2011, and had been experiencing at least abnormally dry conditions since at least the week of October 26, 2010. Numerous wildfires occurred across Texas and adjoining states in 2011; more land area was burned in Texas and Oklahoma since official recordkeeping began in 2002. Between November 2010 and September 2011, Texas wildfires engulfed over 3.7 million acres (1.5 million hectares) of land; within the first week of September 2011, 135,000 acres (54,600 hectares) burned. 

Amid the exceptional drought in early September 2011, Tropical Storm Lee developed in the Gulf of Mexico and produced northeasterly winds across much of East Texas beginning on September 3; the storm itself was centered over the gulf south of the central Louisiana coast. These winds were further accelerated by the presence of high air pressure over Texas. Temperatures ahead of a cold front concurrently moving east of the Rocky Mountains rose above  the day before the fire ignited and on the day of ignition, resulting in relative humidity values falling below 20 percent in the vicinity of Bastrop. Rainfall associated with the tropical storm did not expand west of Interstate 45, allowing the dry conditions in the Bastrop area to persist. Winds decreased over the night of September 3 and into the morning of September 4, but the approach of the cold front into the Bastrop area resulted in the acceleration of winds oncemore. This combination of conditions led the Storm Prediction Center to forecast critical fire weather conditions over southern and central Texas for September 4. Throughout Texas, local fire departments responded to 227 fires on September 4, and of these 57 were new fires. The likelihood of a wildfire igniting given the prevailing weather conditions was around 90 percent.

Fire progression 

The wildfire complex began as three individual fires whose ignitions were reported within three hours on September 4, 2011. The first fire was ignited by fallen power lines near Circle D-KC Estates, Texas, located 16 mi (10 km) northeast of Bastrop. A nearby homeowner called 9-1-1 at 2:20 p.m. CDT, reporting the fire. An investigation performed by the Texas Forest Service (TFS) determined a point of origin near 258 Charolais Drive. The first fire grew quickly after ignition; the Bastrop volunteer fire department requested fire suppression equipment from the TFS at 2:25 p.m. CDT but determined at 2:33 p.m. CDT that the blaze was uncontrollable, prompting evacuations. Thirty-two minutes later after the first ignition, a second fire initiated  to the north near Schwantz Ranch Road and U.S. Highway 290; the TFS determined that this second ignition was also caused by a tree falling upon power lines. An investigation by Bluebonnet Electric Cooperative, which services the power lines in the region, arrived at similar conclusions for the cause of the fires. Pushed southward by a strong northerly wind, the wildfire crossed Texas State Highway 21 at 3:02 p.m. CDT. Mike Fisher, the emergency management coordinator for Bastrop County, formally declared the situation a disaster at that time, authorizing aid from outside of the county. The conflagration subsequently spread into Bastrop State Park and began to encroach upon  Texas State Highway 71. Firefighters set dead grass in the highway's median strip to deter expansion of the flames south of the highway, but were unsuccessful; the first fire crossed the highway at 4:07 p.m. CDT. The two initial fires grew and aggregated into a single wildfire by 5 p.m. CDT after joining near Cardinal Drive, continuing to spread through Bastrop State Park and across Texas State Highway 71. 

The third individual fire was ignited by a tree contacting a power line south of the highway near Tahitian Drive at 5:16 p.m. and eventually merged with the larger fire; the complex of wildfires merged into a single wildfire within 48 hours of ignition. During the first hours of the wildfire, the firefront advanced at  through the pine and yaupon vegetation. Fire whirls were also observed along the firefront. In addition to the strong winds, horizontal convective rolls embedded within the wind flow enabled the wildfire to quickly advance along the tops of the forest canopy, resulting in long streaks of intensely burned vegetation.

The passage of a cold front ushered in a decrease in temperatures on September 5. The movement of Tropical Storm Lee east away from Texas slackened winds, though gusts remained in the  range. The combination of gusts with continued low relative humidity and strong atmospheric instability perpetuated environmental conditions conducive to large fire growth. The Bastrop County Complex remained 0 percent contained heading into the afternoon of September 5, with its advance still unperturbed by firefighting efforts. Flames reached the Colorado River and crossed south of the river twice during the day, hamstringing the ability for firefighters to attain water. State officials stated on September 5 that the Bastrop County Complex had destroyed 476 homes, setting a record for the most homes destroyed by a single wildfire in Texas. The fire had engulfed over 25,000 acres (10,000 hectares) but its spread north of the Colorado River had slowed. Over 250 firefighters were working on containing the fire's spread, aided by bulldozers to create firebreaks and TFS air tankers. 

The conflagration remained completely uncontained on September 6. The TFS released a statement that day describing the fire's behavior as "unprecedented" and that "no one on the face of this Earth has ever fought fires in these extreme conditions." Considerable progress in containing the fire was made on September 7, with fire containment reaching 30 percent and no additional structures being destroyed. The outward advance of the wildfire was mostly stopped, but burning continued within the preexisting burn area. The TFS assessed that 785 homes had been destroyed by September 7, but the enumeration of the number of destroyed homes increased significantly the following day to 1,386 based on surveys conducted by Bastrop County officials. The wildfire was 50 percent contained by noon on September 10 and 70 percent contained by noon on September 12. Dry weather had remained in place over the Bastrop area for nearly two weeks after the wildfire first ignited, but light rain and humid conditions prevailed for the first time on September 17, attenuating flare-ups within the burn area; at the time, the fire was 85 percent contained. After September 22, 18 days after ignition, the wildfire was 95 percent contained.

The wildfire spread past a firebreak on October 4 towards the northern portions of the previous burn scar, burning 309 acres (125 hectares) of land including parts of Griffith League Ranch. This extension of the Bastrop County Complex was called the Old Potato Road fire and was fully contained on October 10. The Bastrop County Complex was declared controlled on October 10. However, flare-ups within the burn area continued until October 29, when the fire was completely extinguished. In total, the wildfire lasted for 55 days.

Though a discrete fire, TFS operations considered the Union Chapel Fire a part of the Bastrop County Complex. The fire consumed 912 acres (369 hectares) and destroyed 25 homes and 2 businesses, prompting the evacuation of 200 people, but was 90 percent contained by September 8.

Firefighting efforts 

The intense fire behavior during the early days of the fire made ground-based fire suppression impractical, limiting fire suppression efforts to aerial firefighting. More than 30 airplanes and helicopters from the Texas National Guard and TFS were involved in the aerial efforts. Within the first week of the fire, aircraft performed 1,647 drops of water or fire retardant on the conflagration. Combined with the nearby Union Chapel Fire, 2,367 drops of water or fire retardant were performed in September 2011, equivalent to 2.3 million gallons (8.7 million liters) of fire suppression payload. The most intense aerial firefighting operations occurred on September 6. Tanker 910a converted McDonnell Douglas DC-10 airtankerwas brought to Austin–Bergstrom International Airport for use in fighting the fire but was ultimately unneeded by the time the requisite fire retardant mixing facility was established at the airport. The converted DC-10 and four Lockheed C-130 Hercules tankers remained on standby at the airport for other deployments after the Bastrop fire diminished. Firefighting crews from 30 agencies assisted in combating the wildfire in its first days. On September 9, 676 personnel were working on fire, the most of any day during the wildfire's spread. In addition to the aerial firefighting efforts, at least 27 bulldozers and 47 pumpers were deployed to help attack the fire. One fire engine was engulfed by the flames on September 4; the crew were rescued but the truck melted in the fire. The Texas Intrastate Fire Mutual Aid System mobilized fifteen "strike teams" composed of 192 personnel to the Bastrop County Complex fire. FEMA authorized eight Fire Management Assistance Grants for Texas wildfires concurrent with the Bastrop County Complex, subsidizing firefighting equipment. On September 25, the fire incident command transitioned its response from type 1 to type 3 as the wildfire became increasingly controlled.

Closures and evacuations 
The first evacuations of homes began within 20 minutes of the first fire being reported on September 4. The evacuation of Bastrop State Park was ordered at 3:16 p.m. CDT on September 4 while evacuation of neighborhoods south of Texas State Highway 71 began at around 3:30 p.m. CDT that day, less than an hour before the fire crossed the highway. Buescher State Park was also closed on September 4 but reopened on September 20 without the fire entering the extent of the park. Twenty subdivisions were subject to evacuations during the spread of the fire, including mandatory evacuation orders, accounting for some 5,000 people. Some residents were allowed to examine the hardest-hit neighborhoods for the first time on September 8. A staggered reentry of residents to additional evacuated subdivisions began on September 12 and continued through September 15 as the wildfire subsided. Bastrop Middle School and the First Baptist Church in Smithville, Texas, were designated as shelters for wildfire evacuees. Volunteers rescued 160 animals from the Bastrop Animal Shelter, evacuating them to Austin. Bastrop Independent School District and Smithville Independent School District closed their schools on September 6 and resumed classes on September 12; the school closures also resulted in cancellations of football and volleyball events for area schools. Bluebonnet Electric Cooperative relocated around 50 of its workers from its Bastrop headquarters to Giddings, Texas, on the night of September 4 to continue monitoring the electric grid. Texas State Highway 71 was closed during the fire and reopened at 8:00 a.m. CDT on September 10. Texas State Highway 21 was also closed but reopened on September 12. The breach of the firebreak on October 4 prompted additional road closures and the evacuations of 25–30 homes.

Impact and effects 

The conflagration consumed 32,400 acres (13,112 hectares) of land, burning across subdivisions within the wildland–urban interface, unmanaged private land, and much of Bastrop State Park. Two people were killed and twelve people were injured. The fire destroyed 1,660 homes and 36 businesses, accounting for approximately 59.4 percent of the structures caught within the wildfire's burn perimeter. Most of the destroyed structures were burned by the wildfire within the first three days of ignition. In some cases, homes burned so intensely that their foundations ruptured. Another 1,091 homes were saved by firefighting efforts. Homes were destroyed in ten subdivisions, with the greatest losses occurring in Circle-D County Acres and Tahitian Village subdivisions. Structures were destroyed in five incorporated and unincorporated communities: Bastrop, Cedar Creek, McDade, Paige, and Smithville. A majority of the structures destroyed were in the Bastrop area. Based on the number of homes destroyed, the Bastrop County Complex was the most destructive in Texas history and third most destructive in U.S. history; however, accounting for fires for which official enumerations of damage do not exist, the fire may have been the sixth most destructive in U.S. history. The previous record for the most homes destroyed by a single fire in Texas was 168, set by the Possum Kingdom Fire in April 2011. The Insurance Council of Texas estimated that the fire inflicted $325 million in insured losses, making the Bastrop County Complex the costliest wildfire in Texas history and among the costliest in U.S. history. The estimated toll exceeded the estimated losses statewide from fires in 2009the costliest year for wildfires in the state before 2011. Accounting for the populations of counties in which destructive wildfires have occurred, the Bastrop County complex may have at the time been the costliest conflagration per capita in the wildland–urban interface in U.S. history based on an estimated loss of $209.3 million as estimated by the Bastrop Tax Appraisal District. Power outages caused or prompted by the fire affected 3,800 homes; all power was restored by September 27.

The two people killed by the fire were found on September 6, 2011, after law enforcement and search crews combed through burned neighborhoods. One person was found near Smithville and the other was found near Paige; both of the fatalities were in neighborhoods that had been evacuated. Urban Search and Rescue Texas Task Force 1 was later deployed to the area to search for additional victims.

The Bastrop County Complex affected 96 percent of Bastrop State Park, leaving only around 100 acres (40 hectares) untouched. Seventy percent of the park was severely burned. The only unburned areas were the park's golf course, the curtilage around structures, and areas subjected to prescribed fires in February 2011. Two scenic overlook buildings within the park built in the 1930s, among other historic structures, were destroyed. The regional state parks office near Bastrop State Park was also destroyed by the fire. However, firefighters successfully prevented the wildfire from damaging many other cabins and structures in the park built by the Civilian Conservation Corps. Vegetation in the park was suffered extensively, leading to the loss of around 70 percent of canopy trees and 90–92 percent of understory vegetation. The elimination of groundcover by the fire enabled extensive soil erosion within the park following heavy rainfall in January 2012, damaging archeological sites including those dating back to the Paleo-Indians.  

The fire also spread across 39 percent of the Lost Pines ecoregion. Most of the habitat of the endangered Houston toad (Anaxyrus houstonensis) was destroyed by the wildfire. Their abundances were not strongly affected by the habitat loss in subsequent years, though the fire may have pushed their populations beyond their typical range within Bastrop County. Similarly, the populations of other native amphibians and reptilesnamely the six-lined racerunner (Cnemidophorus sexlineatus), southern prairie lizard (Sceloporus consobrinus), and Hurter's spadefoot toad (Scaphiopus hurteri)did not decrease as a result of the fire. Riparian forestscommon nesting habitats for birdsremained largely intact in the fire.

Approximately 1.5 million trees were either killed by the fire or assessed by the TFS as being "alive but likely to die soon". More than 16,200 acres (6,600 hectares) of forest burned in the wildfire and over 24 million ft3 (680,000 m) of timber was either destroyed or irreparably damaged, representing 78 percent of trees in the areas affected by the fire. The fire burned unevenly, leaving some areas lightly scorched while burning other areas so thoroughly that all nutrients were purged from the underlying soil. The strong winds that sparked the fire carried ashes and embers to great distances.

Reaction

Political response 

In response to the wildfire, Governor of Texas Rick Perry forwent his presidential campaign stop in South Carolina and returned home on Tuesday, September 6, to "address the public and organize requests for more federal aid". Perry and the Texas Legislature drew criticism over their roles in substantial budget cuts to the Texas Forest Service and volunteer fire departments, both of which the state relies heavily upon for combating wildfires. Mario Gallegos, Jim Dunnam, Kirk Watson, the Center for Public Policy Priorities and others opined that these budget cuts exacerbated conditions. Perry criticized the Obama administration for delays in responding to requests made to FEMA for relief aid.

On September 7, 2011, President Barack Obama personally telephoned Perry to discuss the fires. That same day, the White House issued a formal statement, saying that "Over the last several days, at the request of the Governor, the Administration has granted eight Fire Management Assistance Grants, making federal funds available to reimburse eligible costs associated with efforts to combat the fires. FEMA is actively working with state and local officials to conduct damage assessments and to identify areas where additional federal assistance may be warranted."

Community and social media efforts 

Members of the community were noted for voluntarily working to save several homes from destruction by the wildfire. On September 7, a Facebook page entitled Bastrop Fire – Adopt a Family was created to help match up homeless victims with those willing to help house them or provide other assistance. Local musicians and organizations based in nearby Austin, Texas, organized a benefit concert entitled "Fire Relief: The Concert for Central Texas" to raise money for victims of the Bastrop fire. The concert was hosted by Kyle Chandler at the Frank Erwin Center in Austin on October 17 and featured several musicians including Christopher Cross, the Dixie Chicks, and Willie Nelson, raising over $500,000.

On September 27, 2011, the Bastrop County Long Term Recovery Team (BCLTRT) was formed as a volunteer organization of community members, eventually becoming a 501(c)(3) organization in February 2012. The BCLTRT helped rebuild 133 homes in Bastrop County destroyed by both the Bastrop County Complex fire and subsequent disasters, with additional funding from the American Red Cross and the Salvation Army.

In the aftermath of the wildfire, students at Texas A&M University formed Aggie Wildfire Relief to raise funds for wildfire recovery. The organization started a "Wear White, Wave Maroon" campaign for a home football game against Baylor University on October 15, 2011, raising over $16,000 from the sales of white T-shirts and maroon towels for donations towards the American Red Cross and the Texas Wildfire Relief Fund.

Aftermath 

On September 9, 2011, U.S. President Barack Obama granted a disaster declaration requested by Texas Lieutenant Governor David Dewhurst, authorizing approximately $16.1 million in federal monetary assistance for individuals in Bastrop County affected by the wildfire. The grant followed preliminary assessments conducted by four FEMA teams of the damage. The government of Bastrop County anticipated that post-fire cleanup would cost $25 million, with FEMA funding $19 million. The cost of repairing the damage wrought by the fire was equivalent to five years of property tax revenue for local government entities and services. Bastrop County established the Lost Pines Recovery Team in the aftermath of the wildfire to assess the state of the area's natural resources and devise and disseminate best management practices for those resources. The county government planned the removal of 521,000 yd3 (398,000 m3) of potentially hazardous tree debris, of which 440,000 yd3 (336,000 m3) by April 2012. An additional 65,000 yd3 (50,000 m3) of construction and demolition debris was also removed by the county. Bluebonnet Electric Cooperative replaced 1,223 burned poles in the fire perimeter and added  of electrical wire for $7.1 million.

Vegetation in Bastrop State Park began to regrow after the fire. Recovery efforts were costly, with erosion control costing at least three times the park's annual budget and lolloby pine replanting costing at least seven times the park's annual budget. The park partially reopened on December 2, 2011, but closed again the next month following heavy rainfall. After additional park rehabilitation projects were completed, most hiking trails, camping areas, and cabins in the park reopened to the public.

Several lawsuits were filed against private companies concerning the inadequate pruning of trees near power lines. A class-action lawsuit filed against the Asplundh Tree Expert Company and Bluebonnet Electric Cooperative was dismissed in 2015. The Bastrop County government, Bastrop County Emergency Services District No. 2, Bastrop Independent School District, Smithville Independent School District filed a lawsuit against Asplundh on April 1, 2016, alleging that the defendant failed to sufficiently prune trees that ultimately damaged power lines and sparked the fires while being aware of the associated risk given the prevailing weather conditions. A third lawsuit involving the same parties was filed in 2018 and reached a $5 million settlement in 2020.

See also 
 Hidden Pines Fire – wildfire in Bastrop County in 2015
 Camp Fire (2018) – destructive wildland–urban interface fire in California

Notes

References

External links

Footage of the fire as seen from Texas State Highway 21
Footage of the firefront's advance along the northern edge of Bastrop State Park
Boston Globe photos of Bastrop fire, including va iew from International Space Station
The Fire: Inside the Bastrop County Complex Fire (2011) – documentary concerning the fire and its aftermath

Wildfires in Texas
Wildfires
Bastrop County, Texas